The DC-4 was flying a domestic flight from Algiers to Tamanrasset with several intermediate stops. On approach it descended too low and struck a mountain.

Aircraft 
7T-VAU was a Douglas DC-4 that first flew in 1943. It was powered by 4 piston engines.<ref name="asn"

Flight 
On the night approach to Tamanrasset the plane descended too low and struck a mountainside, 300 meters below the summit. The impact forces and the ensuing fire killed 35 of the 39 people on board and severely injured the 4 survivors.

References 

Aviation accidents and incidents in 1967
 Aviation accidents and incidents in Algeria
1967 in Algeria
Accidents and incidents involving the Douglas DC-4
1967 disasters in Algeria